The 1948 Railway Cup Hurling Championship was the 22nd series of the inter-provincial hurling Railway Cup. Three matches were played between 15 February 1948 and 17 March 1948 to decide the title. It was contested by Connacht, Leinster, Munster and Ulster.

Connacht entered the championship as the defending champions, however, they were defeated by Munster at the semi-final stage.

On 17 March 1948, Munster won the Railway Cup after a 5-05 to 3-05 defeat of Leinster in the final at Croke Park, Dublin. It was their 16th Railway Cup title overall and their first Railway Cup title since 1946. The attendance of 37,103 set a new record for the Railway Cup finals.

Leinster's Jackie Cahill (3-00) and Munster's Christy Ring (1-06) were the Railway Cup top scorers.

Results

Semi-finals

Final

Top scorers

Overall

Single game

Sources

 Donegan, Des, The Complete Handbook of Gaelic Games (DBA Publications Limited, 2005).

References

Railway Cup Hurling Championship
Railway Cup Hurling Championship